Canister filter may refer to various types of filter in different systems:
 Canister-styled aquarium filters
 Canister filter, a filter in the canister of a gas mask
 Canister filter, a canister that is used to filter beer
 Canister filter, a canister-styled fluid filter introduced in some of the Chrysler Corporation's automatic transmissions known as TorqueFlite
 Canister filter, a filter that is used to treat sulfur water
 Canister filter, a respirator canister or cartridge that is used to clean pollution from air
 Canister filter, in compressed air dryer
 Canister oil filter; for example see Mercedes-Benz OM617 engine

See also
 Canister (disambiguation)
 Filtration